The following pages, corresponding to the Gregorian calendar, list the historical events, births, deaths, and holidays and observances of the specified day of the year:

Footnotes

See also
 Leap year
 List of calendars
 List of non-standard dates

External links

 On This Day
 BBC: On This Day
 The New York Times: On This Day
 Library of Congress: Today in History
 History Channel (US): This Day in History
 History Channel (UK): This Day in History
 New Zealand Government: Today in New Zealand History
 Computer History Museum: This Day in History
 Internet Movie Database: This Day in Movie History

Lists of days
Historical anniversaries
Historical anniversaries
Reference material lists